Gary Hill (born April 4, 1951) is an American artist who lives and works in Seattle, Washington. Often viewed as one of the foundational artists in video art, based on the single-channel work and video- and sound-based installations of the 1970s and 1980s, he in fact began working in metal sculpture in the late 1960s. Today he is best known for internationally exhibited installations and performance art, concerned as much with innovative language as with technology, and for continuing work in a broad range of media. His longtime work with intermedia explores an array of issues ranging from the physicality of language, synesthesia and perceptual conundrums to ontological space and viewer interactivity. The recipient of many awards, his influential work has been exhibited in most major contemporary art museums worldwide.

Main themes and works
Gary Hill's work has often been discussed in relation to his incorporation of language/text in video and installation, most evident in a work like Incidence of Catastrophe (1987–88). In the late 1960s, he began making metal sculpture and, in Woodstock, New York, engaged by wire sculpture's sounds, explored extensions into electronic sound, video cameras and tape, playback/feedback, video synthesizers, sound synthesizers, installation-like constructions, video installations, interactive art and public interventions. Later in the 1970s, living in Barrytown, New York, interacting with poets/artists George Quasha and Charles Stein, he extended his growing interest in language to a level of poetics and complex text, as well as performance art and collaboration. Initially "language" for him was not specifically words but the experience of a speaking that emerged inside electronic space (certain sounds "seemed close to human voices"), which he called “electronic linguistics” (first in the transitional non-verbal piece, Electronic Linguistic [1977]). From that point, irrespective of whether a given piece uses text, his work in particular instances inquires into the nature of language as intrinsic to electronic/digital technology as art medium. Verbal language soon enters this electronic focus co-performatively, as an intensification of a dialogue with and within the medium, yet with a new language force all its own, its own unprecedented poetics. Highly realized single-channel works in this process include: Processual Video (1980), Videograms (1980–81), and Happenstance (part one of many parts) (1982–83), another stage of the dialogue with technology as a language site where machines talk back. Here the artist's path moves to the celebrated language-intensive works of the 1980s: Around & About (1980), Primarily Speaking (1981–83), Why Do Things Get in a Muddle? (Come on Petunia) (1984), URA ARU (the backside exists) (1985–86), and Incidence of Catastrophe (1987–88).

Art historian Lynne Cooke summarizes:
A pioneer in his embrace of the then novel medium of video, Hill distinguished himself through a radical approach that both literally and conceptually deconstructed it. Single channel works were soon followed by installations in which video screens were unhoused, suspended, multiplied, miniaturized, or otherwise manipulated. On other occasions, video tubes mysteriously projected unframed images in dark fields; or from oscillating beacons panning an empty room, text and figure swiveled in anamorphic distortion. No artist of Hill's generation probed this medium with such invasive scrutiny, and none deployed it with such protean irreverence. And when his restless curiosity led him to computer based technologies and virtual space in the early Nineties, few of his peers proved so avid or dedicated in exploiting this uncharted terrain for art making. Since he rarely deployed technology as a tool in service to an exploration of the visual world, questions of representation have played a relatively minor role in his work: typically, he treats mediums as sites and enablers of languages both verbal and visual. Surveying with hindsight what now amounts to more than three decades of his activity, it's striking how far his path has veered from his peers'—and not least because it betrays so few allegiances to histories of representation."

The sheer richness and complexity of the artist's work over four decades is open to continual further characterization. As an artist working from a core principle, often with strong conceptual aspects, his inner focus and dialogue within a given medium allows him high variability and unpredictability. Working with one or more principles at a time (e.g., the physicality of the medium and of languaging and imaging; liminality or the intense space between contraries and extremes of appearance), he can make it happen on multiple planes simultaneously—physical, personal, ontological, social, political—without reification of any one of them. Result: a singular event of reflexive speaking that marries mind and machine beyond any notion of reference as such—no stable signifier or signified, yet intense engagement at personal, emotional, and intellectual levels. The piece Clover (1994), part of the Western Washington University Public Sculpture Collection, consists of four monitor tubes placed back to back on a steel platform. Each screen features a man seen from behind walking continuously through a wooded background. The man becomes an apparatus of seeing and movement.  Later works in computer animation—e.g., Liminal Objects (1995-), Frustrum (2006)—challenge one's sense of "object" and mind-body boundaries and the very basis of our "reality." Major projective installations—Tall Ships (1992), HanD HearD (1995–96), Viewer (1996), Wall Piece (2000), Up Against Down (2008)—raise these issues of physicality, objectivity, polyvalent signification, and language itself to a further human dimension—a principle of torsional engagement both within one's own mind and body and up against the surface and face of the other. 
 
He was influenced by the intellectual orientation of conceptual art which dominated art of the 1970s, but he instinctively evolved beyond the conceptual as such, working into a refined domain of principle that put him in full processual and open dialog both with electronic media and the language of thinking. His reading of the fiction and philosophical literary essays of Maurice Blanchot, in particular, provided him with ideas relating to the way in which language impinges on phenomenological experience, and a notion of 'the other'. Such reading informs Hill's visual-poetic explorations of the interrelationships between language, image, identity, and the body. For example, in Cabin Fever he uses the binary opposition of light and darkness to convey the notion of an interaction between a self and an 'other'. He has also explored immersive environments, as seen in his 1992 piece Tall Ships.
Hill's work thoroughly exploits the capacity of video to offer complex nonlinear narratives that encourage active engagement on the part of the viewer. In Roland Barthes' terms, Hill's video narratives can be understood as 'writerly' texts.

Single-channel works viewable online
The following works (alphabetical order) may be viewed at Gary Hill's Videos on Vimeo.com: Around & About (1980), Electronic Linguistic (1977), Equal Time (1979), Figuring Grounds (1985/2008), Happenstance (part one of many parts) (1982–83), Incidence of Catastrophe (1987–88), Isolation Tank (2010–11), Mediations (towards a remake of Soundings) (1979/1986), Picture Story (1979), Processual Video (1980), Site Recite (a prologue) (1989), Site Recite (a prologue) (1989), Tale Enclosure (1985), Videograms (1980–81), Why Do Things Get in a Muddle? (Come On Petunia) (1984).

These works are discussed in detail in An Art of Limina: Gary Hill's Works and Writings, George Quasha & Charles Stein, with a foreword by Lynne Cooke (Barcelona: Ediciones Polígrafa, 2009), which also contains detailed descriptions of Hill's major installations. Updated descriptions and new exhibitions at Gary Hill's website.

Exhibitions
Exhibitions of his work have been presented at museums and institutions worldwide, including solo exhibitions at the Fondation Cartier pour l'Art Contemporain, Paris; San Francisco Museum of Modern Art; Centre Georges Pompidou, Paris; Guggenheim Museum SoHo, New York; Museum für Gegenwartskunst, Basel; Barcelona Museum of Contemporary Art; Kunstmuseum Wolfsburg; Henry Art Gallery, Seattle, Washington; among others. His works are in the permanent collection of many museums including MoMA, New York. Commissioned projects include works for the Science Museum in London and the Seattle Central Library; and the first commissioned installation and performance work for the Colosseum and Temple of Venus and Roma, Rome, Italy.

Complete List of Solo Exhibitions
Complete List of Group Exhibitions

Selected awards
 1979, 1985, 1987, 1993 Fellowships from the National Endowment for the Arts
 1981–82, 1989–90 Fellowships from the Rockefeller Foundation
 1986, 1990 Fellowships from the John Simon Guggenheim Memorial Foundation
 1995 the Leone d'Oro Prize for Sculpture at the Venice Biennale
 1998 a John D. and Catherine T. MacArthur Foundation Award
 2000 the Kurt Schwitters Preis
 2005 Honorary Degree of Doctor Honoris Causa of The University of Fine Arts in Poznań, Poland
 2011 Honorary Degree from Cornish College of the Arts, Seattle, Washington

Life chronology
1951-1968 Born April 4, 1951, in Santa Monica, California. Grows up in Redondo Beach surfing and skateboarding. National skateboard champion in 1964; performs in the Cannes Film Festival prize winner, Skaterdater 
(1965). At 15 meets the artist Anthony Park, who encourages him to take up welding and sculpture. Takes first dose of LSD. Stepfather builds him a small studio in the backyard.

1969 Moves to New York State and attends summer session at the Art Students League in Woodstock, New York. Supports himself with various odd jobs, mostly washing dishes.

1970-72	Studies independently with the painter Bruce Dorfman. Encounters the work of composers La Monte Young and Terry Riley.
After seeing the "New York Painting and Sculpture 1940 – 1970" exhibition at the Metropolitan Museum of Art, makes a series of mixed media constructions using copper coated steel welding rod, wire mesh, canvas and enamel. Experiments extensively with sound generating steel rod constructions and electronically generated sounds. 
First solo exhibition at the Polari Art Gallery in Woodstock, New York.

1973 First experiments with video through Woodstock Community Video in Woodstock, New York. Assists with local cable TV in exchange for equipment use; becomes acquainted with the Videofreeks and Earthscore video groups in upstate New York. 
Improvises sound-generating environmental constructions using industrial welding rods at the Woodstock Artists Association.

1973-74 First group exhibition, "Artists from Upstate New York," at 55 Mercer Gallery in New York City.  Makes first video installation, Hole in the Wall, at the Woodstock Artists Association.  Exhibits first videotapes at The Kitchen in New York.

1974-76 Continues working with Woodstock Community Video as Artists TV Lab coordinator supported by the New York State Council on the Arts. Begins video work correlating image with sounds. 
As artist-in-residence at the Experimental Television Center, Binghamton, New York, meets engineer Dave Jones.

1977 Moves to Barrytown, New York with Dave Jones and builds experimental video tools designed by Jones. Meets poets George Quasha and Charles Stein who become long time friends and collaborators.

1978 Creates first works dealing with the speaking voice in relation to the image. Receives a Production Grant from the New York State Council on the Arts, a Creative Artist Public Service Fellowship, and the first of four National Endowment for the Arts Fellowships. Directs Open Studio Video Project at the Arnolfini Art Center, Rhinebeck, NY, and collaborative performance works with George Quasha et al.

1979-1980 Moves to Buffalo, New York and teaches at the Center for Media Study, State University of New York (SUNY), Buffalo, New York. Meets Woody Vasulka and Steina Vasulka, Paul Sharits, and Hollis Frampton. 
First solo museum exhibition with the installation Mesh at the Everson Museum, Syracuse, New York.  
Produces Soundings as artist-in-residence at WNET/Channel 13, New York, New York. Also completes Around & About, Processual Video, and Black/White/Text, all focusing on the relationship between language and image.

1981 Returns to Barrytown, New York and begins work on Primarily Speaking.  Visits the West Coast for the summer and renews interest in surfing. Recipient of a Rockefeller Video Artist Fellowship.

1982-83 Teaches at the summer graduate program at Bard College, Annandale-on-Hudson, New York.  Invited to the American Center in Paris for a videotape retrospective and meets Anne Angelini, who later performs in several works. Influenced by readings of Gregory Bateson's Steps to an Ecology of Mind and John C. Lilly's Center of the Cyclone and The Scientist.

1984 Moves to Kamakura, Japan supported by a Japan/U.S. Exchange Fellowship and there marries Katherine Bourbonais. Returns to Barrytown, New York for the summer and produces Why Do Things get in a Muddle? (Come On Petunia) with his wife and Charles Stein performing (in the Quasha Stained Glass Studio).
		
1985 Returns to Japan to live and work in Tokyo.  Meets Kyogan Master Don Kenny who performs along with Kathy Bourbonais in URA ARU (the backside exists). As artist-in-residence at SONY in Hon Atsugi, completes the first edit of the work.
Moves to Seattle, Washington and establishes a video program at Cornish College of the Arts.

1986 Birth of daughter, Anastasia. First encounter with the writings of Maurice Blanchot, specifically Thomas the Obscure, which he draws upon for the installation In Situ. Recipient of a Guggenheim Fellowship.

1987 Commissioned by the Museum of Contemporary Art, Los Angeles, California, and exhibits CRUX as a "performance installation" in the auditorium. Visiting artist at the California Institute for the Arts, Valencia, Santa Clarita.

1988 Completes Incidence of Catastrophe, also inspired by Blanchot's Thomas the Obscure, which receives first prize at the World Wide Video Festival in The Hague and at the Montreal Independent Film and Video Festival.
Travels to Paris for six months as a National Endowment for the Arts Exchange Fellow and is commissioned by the Musée national d'art moderne, Centre Georges Pompidou to produce a new work. In the first major collaboration with George Quasha, adapts selected Gnostic texts and eventually produces the installation Disturbance (among the jars). Meets Jacques Derrida who plays a central figure in the piece.

1989 Produces Site Recite (a prologue), commissioned for Spanish Television as part of the series El Arte del Video.

1991 Exhibits the video installation series And Sat Down Beside Her at Galerie des Archives in Paris.  Again, fragments of Blanchot's writings appear, as well as Anne Angelini who performs for the work (and meets "Anne" in Thomas the Obscure).  The Museum of Modern Art, New York, exhibits Inasmuch as It Is Always Already Taking Place.
Commissioned by La Sept of Paris for Live, a series of real time videotapes proposed by Phillipe Grandieux, and produces Solstice d'Hiver, a one-hour real time recording.

1992 Commissions Dave Jones to design a computer-controlled video switcher for a number of "switch" pieces, the first being Between Cinema and a Hard Place.  Meets artist Marine Hugonnier who later appears in Suspension of Disbelief (for Marine). 
Returns to Paris as artist-in-residence at the Hôpital Éphémère.
Recipient of a second Guggenheim Fellowship.

1993 Premieres the installation Tall Ships, commissioned by Jan Hoet for Documenta 9. First of several works in which his daughter, Anastasia, as well as other family members, appear.  
Gary Hill, first museum survey exhibition in Europe organized by the Musée national d'art moderne, Centre Georges Pompidou, Paris.  Travels to Valencia, Vienna and Amsterdam.

1994 Daughter reads Ludwig Wittgenstein for the installation Remarks On Color. "Imaging the Brain Closer than the Eyes," an exhibition of recent works, is organized by the Museum für Gegenwartskunst, Basel, Switzerland.

1994-95 Gary Hill, first museum survey exhibition in the United States organized by the Henry Art Gallery, Seattle, Washington. Travels to Philadelphia, New York, Los Angeles and Kansas City.

1995 Receives the Leone d'Oro, Prize for Sculpture at the Venice Biennale.
1996-98	Produces Reflex Chamber, the first of a number of works to utilize strobe lights in conjunction with images and spoken text; followed by Midnight Crossing, commissioned by Westfälischer Kunstverein, Munster, Germany.  
Collaborates with the choreographer Meg Stuart and her dance company Damaged Goods to produce Splayed Mind Out.  Performed more than 50 times in Europe, South America and the United States.

1998 Recipient of a John D. and Catherine T. MacArthur Foundation Grant.
While artist-in-residence at the Capp Street Project in San Francisco, California, produces 23:59:59:29 - The Storyteller's Room.

2000 Collaborates with George Quasha and Charles Stein on the performance Spring from Undertime (Awaking Awaiting); with Christelle Fillod producing sound for her performance Ship Building in a Kleinbottle; and with the Swedish artist Paulina Wallenberg-Olsson on the Black Performance, performed in Frankfurt, Paris, Hong Kong and Tokyo. 
Receives the Kurt Schwitters Preis 2000 through Niedersächsische Sparkassenstiftung, Hanover, Germany.

2000-01	Receives the Joseph H. Hazen Rome Prize Fellowship and lives at the American Academy in Rome. While in residence produces Goats and Sheep, the first single-channel videotape since 1990, for the publication Gary Hill:  Around & About:  A Performative View, co-published by Éditions du Regard and Fabienne Leclerc of In Situ, Paris. 
Commissioned by the Science Museum, London, and completes permanent installation of HanD HearD - Variation.

2003–05 Commissioned by the Seattle Central Public Library, and completes permanent installation of Astronomy by Day (and other oxymorons)

2003–05 Teaches in France at the École nationale supérieure des beaux-arts, Paris, and Le Fresnoy Studio national des arts contemporains, Tourcoing.

2005 Receives Honorary Degree of Doctor Honoris Causa from The Academy of Fine Arts in Poznań, Poland. Performance tour in Poland (Wrocław, Łódź, Poznań) and Czech Republic (Prague) of Mind on the Line in collaboration with George Quasha, Charles Stein, Aaron Miller & Dorota Czerner.

2014-15 Gary Hill is the main judge for the international art competition in London Passion For Freedom London Festival at Mall Galleries (Exhibition: Mall Galleries 21–26 September 2015).

Principal studies
The main books on Hill's work include An Art of Limina: Gary Hill’s Works and Writings, George Quasha & Charles Stein, foreword by Lynne Cooke (Barcelona: Ediciones Polígrafa, 2009); Gary Hill: Selected Works and Catalogue raisonné, edited by Holger Broeker (Wolfsburg: Kunstmuseum Wolfsburg, 2002); Gary Hill: Around & About: A Performative View (Paris: Éditions du Regard, 2001); and Gary Hill, edited by Robert C. Morgan (Baltimore: PAJ Books / The Johns Hopkins University Press, 2000).

Selected bibliography
Ascending chronological order
 Quasha, George & Charles Stein.  An Art of Limina:  Gary Hill’s Works and Writings.  Barcelona: Ediciones Polígrafa, 2009.  Foreword by Lynne Cooke.
 Ramos, María Elena.  Gary Hill.  Caracas:  Centro Cultural Chacao, 2009.
 Gary Hill / Gerry Judah.  Paris:  Somogy Publishers / LTB Holding, Ltd., 2007.
 In French : Paul-Emmanuel Odin, L'absence de livre [ Gary Hill et Maurice Blanchot – Écriture, vidéo], France, Les presses du réel, 2007.
 Gary Hill:  Resounding Arches / Archi Risonanti. (Catalogue and DVD.)  Rome:  Ministero per i Beni e le Attività Culturali Soprintendenza archeologica di Roma, and Milan:  Mondadori Electa S.p.A., 2005.
 Gary Hill:  Scritti / Interviste. Milan:  Mondadori Electa S.p.A., 2005.
 Mind on the Line:  Gary Hill, George Quasha, Charles Stein, Aaron Miller and Dorota Czerner.  Wroclaw:  WRO Art Center, 2004.
 Unfolding Vision:  Gary Hill, Selected Works 1976–2003.  Taipei:  Museum of Contemporary Art, 2003.
 Barro, David.  Gary Hill:  Poeta da percepção, poet of perception, poeta de la percepción.  Porto:  Mimesis, 2003.
 Quasha, George.  Gary Hill:  Language Willing.  Barrytown, NY:  further/art and Boise: Boise Art Museum, 2002.
 Broeker, Holger, ed.  Gary Hill:  Selected Works and catalogue raisonné.  Wolfsburg:  Kunstmuseum Wolfsburg, 2002.
 Gary Hill:  Around & About:  A Performative View. Paris:  Éditions du Regard, 2001, and Limited Edition (Edition of 100, plus 20 artist's proofs; signed and numbered).
 McAlear, Donna, ed.  Gary Hill.  Winnipeg:  The Winnipeg Art Gallery, 2001.
 Gary Hill:  The Performative Image.  Tokyo:  Gary Hill Exhibition Committee, 2001, unpaginated.
 Morgan, Robert C., ed.  Gary Hill.  Baltimore:  PAJ Books / The Johns Hopkins University Press, 2000.
 Gary Hill:  Instalaciones.  Córdoba:  Ediciones Museo Caraffa, 2000.
 Gary Hill en Argentina:  textos, ensayos, dialogos.  Buenos Aires:  Centro Cultural Recoleta, 2000.
 Gary Hill:  Video Works.  Tokyo:  NTT InterCommunication Center, 1999.
 Kold, Anders, ed. Gary Hill. Aarhus:  Aarhus Kunstmuseum, 1999.
 Gary Hill:  Midnight Crossing.  Warsaw:  Center for Contemporary Art, Ujazdowski Castle, 1998.
 Ceruti, Mary.  Gary Hill:  23:59:59:29 – The Storyteller's Room.  San Francisco:  Capp Street Project, 1998.
 Gary Hill: HanD HearD – Withershins – Midnight Crossing.  Barcelona: Museu d'Art Contemporani de Barcelona, 1998.
 Bélisle, Josée, George Quasha, and Charles Stein.  Gary Hill.  Montreal: Musée d'art contemporain de Montréal, 1998.
 Gary Hill:  Midnight Crossing.  Münster: Westfälischer Kunstverein, 1997.
 o lugar do outro/where the other takes place.  Rio de Janeiro: Magnetoscópio, Centro Cultural Banco do Brasil, 1997.
 Quasha, George and Charles Stein.  Viewer: Gary Hill's Projective Installations—Number 3.  Barrytown, NY: Station Hill Arts, 1997.
 Quasha, George and Charles Stein.  Tall Ships: Gary Hill's Projective Installations—Number 2.  Barrytown, NY: Station Hill Arts, 1997.
 Quasha, George and Charles Stein.  Gary Hill:  Hand Heard - Liminal Objects. Paris:  Galerie des Archives, and Barrytown, NY:  Station Hill Arts, 1996.
 Vischer, Theodora, ed.  Gary Hill:  Imagining the Brain Closer than the Eyes. Basel:  Museum für Gegenwartskunst, Ostfildern:  Cantz, 1995.
 Gary Hill:  Tall Ships, Clover. Stockholm:  Riksutställningar, 1995.
 Thériault, Michèle.  Gary Hill. Selected videotapes 1978–1990.  Toronto: Art Gallery of Ontario, 1994, unpaginated.
 Bruce, Chris, ed. Gary Hill. Seattle:  Henry Art Gallery, 1994.
 Gary Hill: In Light of the Other. Oxford: The Museum of Modern Art Oxford and Liverpool: Tate Gallery Liverpool, 1993.
 Gary Hill:  Sites Recited.  Long Beach, California:  Long Beach Museum of Art, 1993.
 Gary Hill.  Valencia:  I.V.A.M. Centre del Carme, 1993.
 Gary Hill. Amsterdam: Stedelijk Museum and Vienna: Kunsthalle, Wien, 1993.
 Van Assche, Christine. Gary Hill. Paris: Editions du Centre Georges Pompidou, 1992.
 Gary Hill: I Believe It Is an Image.  Tokyo: Watari Museum of Contemporary Art, 1992.
 Gary Hill, Video Installations. Eindhoven: Stedelijk Van Abbemuseum, 1992.
 Sarrazin, Stephen. Chimaera Monographe No. 10 (Gary Hill). Montbéliard: Centre International de Création Vidéo Montbéliard, Belfort, 1992.
 Gary Hill: Between Cinema and a Hard Place.  Paris: OCO, Espace d'Art Contemporain, 1991.
 Gary Hill:  And Sat Down Beside Her. Paris: Galerie des Archives, 1990.
 OTHERWORDSANDIMAGES: Video by Gary Hill. Copenhagen: Video Gallerie/Ny Carlsberg Glyptotek, 1990.
 Gary Hill: DISTURBANCE (among the jars), text by George Quasha. Villeneuve d'Ascq: Musée d'Art Moderne, 1988.

References

External links
Gary Hill's website
Gary Hill's profile and selected videos on Vimeo
An Art of Limina: Gary Hill's Works and Writings by George Quasha and Charles Stein
EAI:Gary Hill and list of video works by Gary Hill.
Gary Hill on artnet
Gary Hill in the Video Data Bank
An intelligent review of Hill's Between Cinema and a Hard Place by S. Brent Plate, originally published in Criticism, Winter 2003.
'Image, Body, Text' exhibition at the SFMOMA
SFMOMA interactive multimedia feature on Gary Hill
Gary Hill in the Mediateca Media Art Space
Gary Hill biography on Media Art Net
Gary Hill (video) on Henry Art Gallery Northwest Artists online gallery
Gary Hill’s more texts and artworks in the Experimental Television Center and its Repository in the Rose Goldsen Archive of New Media Art, Cornell University Library.

1951 births
American video artists
Artists from Seattle
Cornish College of the Arts faculty
Living people
MacArthur Fellows
People from Barrytown, New York
People from Santa Monica, California